A list of windmills in Scotland.

Locations

Aberdeenshire

Angus

Ayrshire

Banffshire

Berwickshire

Caithness

Clackmannanshire

Dumfriesshire

East Lothian

Fife

Forfarshire

Invernessshire

Kirkcudbrightshire

Kincardineshire

Lanarkshire

Midlothian

Morayshire

Orkney

Perthshire

Renfrewshire

Rossshire

Roxburghshire

Stirlingshire

West Lothian

Wigtownshire

Shetland

Sources

Maps

1773 Armstrong
1788 John McArthur
1816 Forrest
1824 Fowler
1826 Johnson
1828 John Thomson
All other dates are Ordnance Survey maps.

Notes

Mills in bold are still standing, known building dates are indicated in bold. Text in italics denotes indicates that the information is not confirmed, but is likely to be the case stated.

References

Windmills in Scotland
Scotland
windmills